Stictane rectilinea is a moth in the family Erebidae. It was described by Snellen in 1879. It is found in China, Singapore and on Sulawesi in Indonesia.

References

Moths described in 1879
Nudariina